Blake is a given name which originated from Old English. Its derivation is uncertain; it could come from "blac", a nickname for someone who had dark hair or skin, or from "blaac", a nickname for someone with pale hair or skin.

Blake was the name of one of the 14 Tribes of Galway in Ireland. These Blakes were descendants of Richard Caddell, alias Blake, who was involved in the Norman invasion of Ireland in 1169. As such a long present foreign name, it became known as de Bláca in Irish.

Notable people with the given name "Blake" include

A
Blake Aaron, American guitarist
Blake Acres (born 1995), Australian rules footballer
Blake Adams (born 1975), American golfer
Blake Ahearn (born 1984), American basketball coach
Blake Aldridge (born 1982), British diver
Blake Allen (born 1988), American composer
Blake Anderson (born 1984), American actor
Blake Anderson (American football) (born 1969), American football coach
Blake Andrews (born 1968), American photographer
Blake Annen (born 1991), American football player
Blake Archbold (born 2001), Australian footballer
Blake Austin (born 1991), Australian rugby league footballer
Blake Ayshford (born 1988), Australian rugby league footballer

B
Blake Bailey (born 1963), American writer
Blake Baker (born 1982), American football coach
Blake Ball (1938–2006), Canadian ice hockey player
Blake Barnett (born 1995), American football player
Blake Bartlett (born 1993), Bahamian sprinter
Blake Bashoff (born 1981), American actor
Blake Baxter (born 1963), American musician
Blake Beavan (born 1989), American baseball player
Blake Beemer (born 1991), American baseball player
Blake Bell (born 1991), American football player
Blake Bellefeuille (born 1977), American ice hockey player
Blake Berris (born 1984), American actor
Blake Bjorklund (born 1985), American stock car racing driver
Blake Blackburn (born 1992), Australian sports shooter
Blake Bodily (born 1998), American soccer player
Blake Bolden (born 1991), American ice hockey player
Blake Bortles (born 1992), American football player
Blake Aoki Borysewicz (born 1993), Japanese-American basketball player
Blake Nelson Boyd (born 1970), American actor
Blake Brandel (born 1997), American football player
Blake Brettschneider (born 1989), American soccer player
Blake Broadhurst (born 1985), Australian rules footballer
Blake Brockermeyer (born 1973), American football player
Blake Brockington (1996–2015), American activist
Blake Broszus (born 2000), Canadian fencer
Blake Burdette (born 1980), American rugby union footballer
Blake Butler (1924–1981), English actor
Blake Butler (author) (born 1979), American writer

C
Blake Caldwell (born 1984), American cyclist
Blake Camp (born 1983), American soccer player
Blake Campbell (born 1982), Australian rules footballer
Blake Caparello (born 1985), Australian boxer
Blake Caracella (born 1977), Australian rules footballer
Blake Carpenter (born 1991), American politician
Blake Cashman (born 1996), American football player
Blake Cederlind (born 1996), American baseball player
Blake Chancey (born 1962), American record producer
Blake Chanslor (1920–2009), American businessman
Blake Charlton (born 1979), American author
Blake Christensen (born 1995), American ice hockey player
Blake Christian (born 1997), American professional wrestler
Blake Clark (born 1946), American actor and comedian
Blake Coburn (born 1995), New Zealand cricketer
Blake Cochrane (born 1991), Australian Paralympic swimmer
Blake Coleman (born 1991), American ice hockey player
Blake Comeau (born 1986), Canadian ice hockey player
Blake Converse (born 1965), American admiral
Blake Cooper (born 2001), American actor
Blake Corum (born 2000), American football player
Blake Costanzo (born 1984), American football player
Blake Countess (born 1993), American football player
Blake Crouch (born 1978), American author
Blake Cullen (born 2002), English cricketer
Blake Curd (born 1967), American politician

D
Blake Davis (disambiguation), multiple people
Blake Dean (disambiguation), multiple people
Blake Debassige (born 1956), Canadian artist
Blake DeLong (born 1980), American actor
Blake Dermott (born 1961), Canadian football player
Blake Desjarlais (born 1993), Canadian politician
Blake DeWitt (born 1985), American baseball player
Blake Dietrick (born 1993), American basketball player
Blake F. Donaldson (1892–1966), American physician
Blake Doriot, American politician
Blake Doyle (born 1954), American baseball coach
Blake Dunlop (born 1953), Canadian ice hockey player

E
Blake Edwards (disambiguation), multiple people
Blake Elliott (born 1981), American football player
Blake Ellis (architect), American architect
Blake Ellis (tennis) (born 1999), Australian tennis player
Blake Emmons, Canadian singer
Blake Enever (born 1991), Australian rugby union footballer
Blake Enzie (born 2001), Canadian skeleton racer
Blake Evans (born 1980), Canadian ice hockey player
Blake McIver Ewing (born 1985), American singer-songwriter
Blake Ezor (born 1966), American football player

F
Blake Farber (born 1985), American music director
Blake Farenthold (born 1961), American politician
Blake Feese (born 1982), American race car driver
Blake Ferguson (disambiguation), multiple people
Blake Filippi (born 1980), American politician
Blake Fitzpatrick (born 1955), Canadian photographer
Blake Fleming (born 1972), American drummer
Blake Foster (born 1985), American actor
Blake Francis (born 1998), American basketball player
Blake Freeland (born 2000), American football player
Blake Frischknecht (born 1995), American soccer player

G
Blake Gailen (born 1985), American-Israeli baseball player
Blake Gaudry (born 1991), American gymnast
Blake Geoffrion (born 1988), American ice hockey player
Blake Gibbons (born 1961), American actor
Blake Gibson (born 1995), New Zealand rugby union footballer
Blake Gideon (born 1989), American football coach
Blake Gillikin (born 1998), American football player
Blake Goldring (born 1957), Canadian philanthropist
Blake Gopnik (born 1963), American art critic
Blake Gottesman (born 1980), American politician
Blake Govers (born 1996), Australian field hockey player
Blake Green (born 1986), Australian rugby league footballer
Blake Griffin (born 1989), American basketball player
Blake Grima (born 1984), Australian rules footballer
Blake Grossman, British corporate executive

H
Blake Hamilton (born 1994), American basketball player
Blake Hance (born 1996), American football player
Blake Hardwick (born 1997), Australian rules footballer
Blake Harnage (born 1988), American songwriter
Blake Harrison (born 1985), British actor
Blake Haubeil (born 1999), American football player
Blake Hawksworth (born 1983), American baseball player
Blake Heron (1982–2017), American actor
Blake Alphonso Higgs (1915–1986), Bahamian singer
Blake Hillman (born 1996), American ice hockey player
Blake Hoffarber (born 1988), American basketball player
Blake Hood (born 1985), American actor
Blake Horton (born 1994), Australian footballer
Blake Hounshell (1978–2023), American journalist
Blake Huffman (1902–1985), Canadian politician
Blake Hunter (born 1934), American television producer
Blake Hutcheson, Canadian corporate executive

I
Blake Irving (born 1959), American corporate executive

J
Blake Jackson (born 1994), American football player
Blake Jarwin (born 1994), American football player
Blake Jenner (born 1992), American actor
Blake Johnson, American politician
Blake Johnson (Arkansas politician), American politician
Blake Jones (born 1997), American stock car racing driver
Blake Judd (born 1982), American musician
Blake Judd (filmmaker) (born 1981), American writer

K
Blake Kessel (born 1989), American ice hockey player
Blake Koch (born 1985), American stock car racing driver
Blake Krikorian (1967–2016), American entrepreneur
Blake Kyd (born 1988), South African rugby union footballer

L
Blake Lalli (born 1983), American baseball player
Blake Lawrie (born 1997), Australian rugby league footballer
Blake Lazarus (born 1988), Greek rugby league footballer
Blake Leary (born 1990), Australian rugby league footballer
Blake Lee (born 1983), American actor
Blake Leeper (born 1989), American Paralympic athlete
Blake Leibel (born 1981), Canadian murderer
Blake Leigh-Smith (born 1990), Australian motorcycle racer
Blake Lewis (born 1981), American singer
Blake Leyh (born 1962), American composer
Blake Lindsley (born 1973), American actress
Blake Little, American photographer
Blake Lively (born 1987), American actress
Blake Lizotte (born 1997), American ice hockey player
Blake Lloyd, Canadian engineer
Blake Lothian (born 2002), American stock car racing driver
Blake Lynch (born 1997), American football player

M
Blake MacDonald (born 1976), Canadian curler
Blake Malone (born 2001), American soccer player
Blake Marnell, American activist
Blake Marshall (born 1965), Canadian football player
Blake Martinez (born 1994), American football player
Blake Masters (born 1986), American politician and author
Blake Masters (screenwriter), American screenwriter
Blake Mawson (born 1984), Canadian actor
Blake Mazza (born 1998), American football player
Blake McCormick (born 1964), American television producer
Blake McGrath (born 1983), Canadian dancer
Blake Michael (born 1996), American actor
Blake Miguez (born 1981), American politician
Blake Miller (disambiguation), multiple people
Blake Mills (born 1986), American singer and songwriter
Blake Moore (born 1980), American politician
Blake Moore (American football) (born 1958), American football player
Blake Morant, American academic administrator
Blake Morgan, American musician
Blake Morrison (born 1950), British poet and author
Blake Morton (born 1991), American curler
Blake Mott (born 1996), Australian tennis player
Blake Mueller (born 1982), Australian rugby league footballer
Blake Murphy (born 2000), Irish Gaelic footballer
Blake Mycoskie (born 1976), American entrepreneur

N
Blake Neely (born 1969), American composer
Blake Nelson (born 1965), American author
Blake Paul Neubert (born 1981), American painter
Blake T. Newton (1889–1977), American politician
Blake Nill (born 1962), Canadian football player
Blake Nordstrom (1960–2019), American businessman

O
Blake Ochoa (born 1985), Spanish baseball player
Blake O'Connor (born 2000), Australian musician
Blake Oshiro (born 1970), American politician
Blake Ostler (born 1957), American philosopher

P
Blake Papsin (born 1959), Canadian otolaryngologist
Blake Parker (born 1985), American football player
Blake Parlett (born 1989), Canadian ice hockey player
Blake Paulson, American politician
Blake Pedersen (born 1965), Canadian politician
Blake Pelly (1907–1990), Australian politician
Blake Percival, American whistleblower
Blake Pieroni (born 1995), American swimmer
Blake Pietila (born 1993), American ice hockey player
Blake Pope (born 2003), American soccer player
Blake Pouliot (born 1994), Canadian violinist
Blake Powell (born 1991), American soccer player
Blake Price (born 1974), Canadian sports broadcaster
Blake Proehl (born 1999), American football player

Q
Blake Quick (born 2000), Australian cyclist

R
Blake Reid, Canadian singer-songwriter
Blake Ricciuto (born 1992), Australian footballer
Blake Richards (born 1974), Canadian politician
Blake Richardson (disambiguation), multiple people
Blake Ritson (born 1978), English actor and director
Blake Robbins (born 1965), American actor
Blake Robison, American actor
Blake Roney (born 1958), American entrepreneur
Blake Rosenthal (born 1990), American figure skater
Blake Ross (born 1985), American software engineer
Blake Russell (born 1975), American runner
Blake Rutherford (born 1997), American baseball player

S
Blake Sandberg (born 1975), American musician
Blake L. Sartini (born 1959), American entrepreneur
Blake Schilb (born 1983), American-Czech basketball player
Blake Schlueter (born 1986), American football player
Blake Schraader (born 1994), South African cricketer
Blake Schwarzenbach (born 1967), American musician
Blake Sennett (born 1973), American musician
Blake Shapen (born 2001), American football player
Blake Shelton (born 1976), American singer
Blake Shepard, American voice actor
Blake Shields, American actor
Blake Shinn (born 1987), Australian jockey
Blake Signal (born 1982), New Zealand lawn bowler
Blake Sims (born 1992), American football player
Blake Skjellerup (born 1985), New Zealand speed skater
Blake Slatkin (born 1997), American songwriter
Blake Sloan (born 1975), American ice hockey player
Blake Smith (born 1991), American soccer player
Blake Smith (baseball) (born 1987), American baseball player
Blake Snell (born 1992), American baseball player
Blake Snyder (1957–2009), American screenwriter
Blake Solly, Australian rugby executive
Blake Speers (born 1997), Canadian ice hockey player
Blake Spence (born 1975), American football player
Blake Stein (born 1973), American baseball player
Blake Stephen (born 1960), Canadian ice hockey player
Blake Stephens, American politician
Blake Stepp (born 1982), American basketball player
Blake Stern (1917–1987), American tenor
Blake Stowell, American corporate executive
Blake Strode (born 1987), American lawyer
Blake Swihart (born 1992), American baseball player

T
Blake Taaffe (born 1999), Australian rugby league footballer
Blake Taylor (born 1995), American baseball player
Blake Tekotte (born 1987), American baseball player
Blake Thompson (born 1993), Australian footballer
Blake Thomson (born 1997), Australian cricketer
Blake Tillery (born 1983), American politician
Blake Trahan (born 1993), American baseball player
Blake Treinen (born 1988), American baseball player
Blake Troop  (born 1987), American MMA fighter and professional wrestler

V
Blake R. Van Leer (1893–1956), American academic administrator
Blake Wayne Van Leer (1926–1997), American naval officer

W
Blake Wagner (born 1988), American soccer coach
Blake Wallace (born 1992), Australian rugby league footballer
Blake Ward (born 1956), Canadian sculptor
Blake Watson (1903–1998), Canadian ice hockey player
Blake Wescott, American musician
Blake Wesley (disambiguation), multiple people
Blake Wheeler (born 1986), American ice hockey player
Blake White (born 2000), American-Jamaican footballer
Blake Whitlatch (born 1955), American football player
Blake Colburn Wilbur (1901–1974), American surgeon
Blake S. Wilson, American researcher
Blake Williams (born 1985), Australian motocross racer
Blake Williams (basketball) (1924–2003), American basketball player
Blake Windred (born 1997), Australian golfer
Blake Wingle (born 1960), American football player
Blake Wise (born 1989), American singer
Blake Wood (born 1985), American baseball player
Blake Woodruff (born 1995), American actor
Blake Workman (1908–1983), American football player
Blake Worsley (born 1987), Canadian swimmer
Blake Wotherspoon (born 1997), Australian field hockey player

Y
Blake Young (disambiguation), multiple people

Fictional characters
Blake Belladonna, a character in the animated web series RWBY
Blake Carrington, a character on the television series Dynasty
Blake Marler, a character on the drama series Guiding Light
Blake Tower, a character in the comic book series Marvel Comics

See also
Blake (disambiguation), a disambiguation page for "Blake"
Blake (surname), a page for people with the surname "Blake"

References

English feminine given names
English unisex given names
English masculine given names

bg:Блейк
cs:Blake
de:Blake
fr:Blake
it:Blake
he:בלייק
lv:Bleiks
nl:Blake
pl:Blake
pt:Blake
ru:Блейк